Major-General David Anthony Hirst Shaw CBE (born 19 February 1957) is a former British Army officer who commanded 2nd Division.

Career
Brought up in Sri Lanka, Shaw was commissioned into the Royal Artillery in 1976 and went on to take part in operations in Cyprus, Bosnia and Northern Ireland. He was promoted to brigadier and appointed to command 15 (North East) Brigade in 2002, before becoming Assistant Chief of Staff, Communications in 2004 and Director of Media and Communication at HQ Land Forces in 2007. He took up the post of General Officer Commanding 2nd Division and Governor of Edinburgh Castle in 2009.

Shaw was appointed a Commander of the Order of the British Empire (CBE) in the 2012 New Years Honours List. He retired from the Army on 17 February 2012. 

Shaw is co-founder and CEO of Launchpad (2013), a charity based in Newcastle and Liverpool that helps mostly homeless veterans make a successful transition to civilian life.

Launchpad was visited by Prince Harry in early 2015. 

Shaw founded the Veterans’ Foundation in 2016 and is currently CEO.  This charity raises funds for other armed forces’ charities and charitable activities.

Shaw is also a part-time artist.

References

External links
Armed Forces  & Veterans
Kohima Educational Trust
Shaw Fundraising

1957 births
Living people
British Army generals
NATO personnel in the Bosnian War
Royal Artillery officers
Commanders of the Order of the British Empire
Academics of Robert Gordon University
Founders of charities